Dion Rory Jordan (born March 5, 1990) is an American football defensive end who is a free agent. He played college football at Oregon and was drafted by the Miami Dolphins with the third pick of the 2013 NFL Draft. He has also been a member of the Seattle Seahawks and Oakland Raiders.

Early years
Jordan attended Chandler High School in Chandler, Arizona. He played both tight end and defensive end.  He caught 54 passes for 804 yards and 13 touchdowns as a junior. As a senior, he caught 13 passes for 292 yards and three touchdowns in six games before the remainder of his season was curtailed while recovering from a serious off-the-field accident. He was a four-star prospect, and was ranked as the 10th overall tight end in the country by Scout.com.

In track & field, Jordan was one of the state's top performers in the 110 and 300-meter hurdles. He recorded times of 14.24 seconds and 38.27 seconds in those events respectively. At the 2008 5A I Fiesta Region, he won the shot put (14.27 m) and placed fourth in the long jump (6.40 m).

College career
Jordan attended the University of Oregon, where he played for the Oregon Ducks football team from 2008 to 2012.  He redshirted in 2008.  In 2010, he switched from tight end to defensive end. He finished the season with 33 tackles and two sacks.  As a first-year starter in 2011, Jordan was a first-team All-Pac-12 Conference selection after recording 42 tackles, 13 tackles for loss, and 7.5 sacks. He was also named a first-team All-Pac-12 selection in 2012, after recording 44 tackles, 10.5 tackles for loss, and 5 sacks.

On February 23, 2013, Jordan announced that he would undergo surgery to repair a torn labrum. His recovery time required 3 to 4 months.

College statistics

Professional career

Jordan was selected in the first round, third overall in the 2013 NFL Draft by the Miami Dolphins, who traded up to acquire the pick from the Oakland Raiders. He became the highest selected Oregon Duck since Joey Harrington in 2002.

Miami Dolphins
Jordan appeared in all 16 games in his rookie year of 2013 making 26 tackles, two sacks, and two passes defended.

On July 3, 2014, he was suspended for the first four games of the 2014 season for violating the NFL's performance-enhancing substance policy. On September 19, 2014, he again violated the drug policy and was given an additional two games to add for the suspension.

On April 28, 2015, Jordan was suspended for the entire 2015 season for violating the NFL's performance-enhancing substance policy for a third time. According to sources, he did not fail a drug test; however, it was determined that one of his test samples was diluted, which is considered a strike.

He was conditionally reinstated by the NFL on July 29, 2016, ending what was a 15-month suspension. The conditions stipulated in the reinstatement included that he would be able to return to the team for training camp, establishment of treatment resources for Jordan in Miami prior to his being allowed to play in any preseason games, a meeting with the NFL prior to being allowed to play in Week 1 of the regular season, and an in-season meeting with the NFL prior to a full reinstatement. Still, Jordan did not play a down at all during 2016. On March 31, 2017, he was released after failing a physical.

Seattle Seahawks
On April 11, 2017, Jordan was signed by the Seattle Seahawks. He was placed on the reserve/non-football injury list to start the season with a knee injury. On November 8, the Seahawks activated Jordan off reserves to the active roster. He played in five games of the season, finishing with 10 tackles and 4 sacks.

On March 14, 2018, the Seahawks placed a first-round restricted free agent tender on Jordan. On June 7, 2018 Jordan underwent minor knee surgery. On May 14, 2019, he was suspended for 10 games due to usage of Adderall. He admitted that he was taking it to alleviate his ADHD, but his therapeutic use exemption had expired and his appeal was declined.

Oakland Raiders
On November 9, 2019, Jordan signed with the Oakland Raiders. He was immediately placed on the reserve/suspended list to finish out his 10-game suspension. He was reinstated from suspension on November 12.

San Francisco 49ers
Jordan signed with the San Francisco 49ers on August 7, 2020. He was released during final roster cuts on September 5, 2020, and signed to the practice squad the next day. He was promoted to the active roster on September 23, 2020.

On November 29, 2021, the New Orleans Saints hosted Jordan for a workout.

Career statistics

References

External links
 
 Oregon Ducks bio

1990 births
Living people
Sportspeople from Chandler, Arizona
Players of American football from San Francisco
Players of American football from Arizona
American football defensive ends
American football linebackers
Oregon Ducks football players
Miami Dolphins players
Seattle Seahawks players
Oakland Raiders players
San Francisco 49ers players